Om Raut is an Indian filmmaker. Raut has received 68th National Film Awards for Best Popular Film for the film Tanhaji. He received several accolades for his 2015 film Lokmanya: Ek Yug Purush. 

Raut's upcoming working is the hindu mythological film Adipurush, an adaptation of Ramayana, starring Prabhas in the titular role of Lord Rama.

Early life 
Raut was born in Mumbai to his mother Neena—a television producer, and father Bharatkumar—a senior journalist, well-known author & successful Rajya Sabha member. Raut's grandfather J. S. Bandekar (1925–2017) was a documentary filmmaker & editor.

After working as a child artist in several theatre plays and ad films, Raut's feature film acting debut came with a lead role in Karamati Coat in 1993. He did a post-graduate degree in films from Syracuse University's College of Visual and Performing Arts in New York State, and also holds a bachelor degree in Electronics Engineering from the Shah & Anchor College of Engineering in Mumbai.

Career 
After completing his education, Raut worked as a writer & director for MTV Network in New York City. He moved back to India and later became the creative head of DAR Motion Pictures, before he produced City of Gold and Haunted – 3D.

Raut's directorial debut was the Marathi film Lokmanya: Ek Yug Purush (2015), the first production of Neena Raut Films, which he had co-founded with his mother. It earned him the Filmfare Award for Best Debut Director. The 2020 Hindi period action film Tanhaji, marked the first Hindi directorial venture of Raut. His next film is Adipurush starring Prabhas and Saif Ali Khan which is set to release on June 16, 2023.

Filmography

As executive producer
 City Of Gold (2010)

Awards 
 Filmfare Award 2016: Best Debut Director for Lokmanya: Ek Yug Purush
 52nd Maharashtra State Awards 2015: Best Director for Lokmanya: Ek Yug Purush
 66th Filmfare Awards 2021: Best Director for Tanhaji: The Unsung Warrior
 68th National Film Awards 2022: Best Popular Film for Tanhaji: The Unsung Warrior

References

External links 
 
 

1981 births
Living people
21st-century Indian film directors
21st-century Indian writers
Actors in Hindi cinema
Film directors from Mumbai
Film producers from Mumbai
Filmfare Awards winners
Hindi-language film directors
Hindi film producers
Male actors from Mumbai
Marathi film directors
Marathi film producers
Marathi screenwriters
Screenwriters from Mumbai
Syracuse University College of Visual and Performing Arts alumni
Telugu film directors